Fausto Sucena Rasga Filho, also commonly known simply as Fausto (12 April 1929 – 30 July 2007) was a Brazilian basketball player. He competed in the men's tournament at the 1956 Summer Olympics.

References

External links
 

 
1929 births
2007 deaths
Brazilian men's basketball players
1954 FIBA World Championship players
Olympic basketball players of Brazil
Basketball players at the 1956 Summer Olympics
Basketball players from São Paulo